Tuzhinka (Tuja) is a rural locality (a settlement) and the administrative centre of Tuzhinkinskoye Rural Settlement, Yeravninsky District, Republic of Buryatia, Russia. The population was 507 as of 2017. There are 8 streets.

Geography 
Tuzhinka is located 78 km southwest of Sosnovo-Ozerskoye (the district's administrative centre) by road. Ust-Egita is the nearest rural locality.

References 

Rural localities in Yeravninsky District